Jorge Luis Ruiz Sandoval (born 1 octubre 1989) is a Venezuelan professional footballer as a forward who most recently played for Limón.

Club career
Ruiz made his Liga I debut playing for ACS Poli Timișoara on 19 July 2013 in a match against Dinamo București.

References

External links
 

1989 births
Living people
People from Guasdualito
Venezuelan footballers
Association football forwards
Yaracuyanos FC players
ACS Poli Timișoara players
Trujillanos FC players
Liga I players
Venezuelan expatriate footballers
Expatriate footballers in Romania
Venezuelan expatriate sportspeople in Romania